Keiferia vorax is a moth in the family Gelechiidae. It was described by Edward Meyrick in 1939. It is found in Argentina.

References

Keiferia
Moths described in 1939
Taxa named by Edward Meyrick